Toh Wei Soong (born 11 September 1998) is a Singaporean competitive swimmer. He was a bronze medallist in the S7 50M Freestyle at the 2018 Commonwealth Games. and he was also a two-time gold medallist at the 2018 Asian Para Games for the S7 50m Freestyle and the S7 100M Freestyle events.

Early life and education
At the age of 2, Toh was affected by Transverse myelitis, a condition which is caused by the inflammation of the spinal cord and has affected his lower nervous system. The eldest of two children in his family, Toh studied in Anglo-Chinese School (Junior) and Anglo-Chinese School (Independent), graduating from the International Baccalaureate (IB) programme in 2017.

Toh is currently studying at the National University of Singapore in the University Scholars Programme.

Swimming career
Toh started swimming competitively at the age of 14. He won the first-ever Special Event at the annual SSSC Championships, competing as a para-swimmer for ACS(I). In 2013 he joined Aquatic Performance Swim Club under the Singapore National Para-Swimming Team and met his current coach, Ang Peng Siong, a former Singaporean Olympic swimmer.

2013 Asian Youth Para Games
At the 2013 Asian Youth Para Games held in Kuala Lumpur, Malaysia, Toh won a silver medal in the Men's 100 metre freestyle S8 event, his first medal in an international event.

2015 ASEAN Para Games
At the 2015 ASEAN Para Games held in Singapore, Toh rose to prominence by winning three gold medals and one silver medal from his 4 events. He was also a torch bearer alongside other Singaporean athletes such as Yip Pin Xiu and Tay Wei Ming

2017 ASEAN Para Games
At the 2017 ASEAN Para Games held in Kuala Lumpur, Malaysia, Toh won two gold medals and one silver medal from his 3 events, breaking several Games records for his events.

2018 Commonwealth Games
At the 2018 Commonwealth Games held in Gold Coast, Australia, Toh won the first para-swimming medal for Singapore in the Men's 50 metre freestyle S7 event, obtaining a bronze medal. He is also the second person to win a swimming medal for Singapore at the Commonwealth Games, following up on Joseph Schooling's silver medal at the 2014 Commonwealth Games in Glasgow, UK.

2018 Asian Para Games
At the 2018 Asian Para Games held in Jakarta, Indonesia, Toh won the first medal for Singapore at the 2018 Asian Para Games, obtaining a gold medal in the Men's 50 metre freestyle S7 event on the first day of competition, beating competitors Daisuke Ejima from Japan and Ernie Gawilan from the Philippines. He went on to win another gold medal in the Men's 100 metre freestyle S7 event as well as a bronze medal in the Men's 100 metre backstroke S7 event, becoming the most decorated Singaporean athlete of the Games.

References

External links
ActiveSG Profile

1998 births
Living people
Singaporean sportspeople of Chinese descent
Singaporean male backstroke swimmers
Singaporean male freestyle swimmers
Commonwealth Games medallists in swimming
Commonwealth Games silver medallists for Singapore
Commonwealth Games bronze medallists for Singapore
Swimmers at the 2018 Commonwealth Games
Swimmers at the 2020 Summer Paralympics
Swimmers at the 2022 Commonwealth Games
21st-century Singaporean people
Medalists at the 2018 Asian Para Games
Medallists at the 2018 Commonwealth Games
Medallists at the 2022 Commonwealth Games